The Ginger Group was not a formal political party in Canada, but a faction of radical Progressive and Labour Members of Parliament who advocated socialism. The term ginger group also refers to a small group with new, radical ideas trying to act as a catalyst within a larger body.

The Ginger Group split with the Progressive Party in 1924 when Progressive leader Robert Forke proved too eager to accommodate the Liberal government of William Lyon Mackenzie King and agreed to support the government's budget with only minimal concessions. J. S. Woodsworth, using his right as the leader of the Independent Labour MPs, moved a stronger amendment to the budget based on demands the Progressives had made in earlier years but had since abandoned. The Progressive and Labour MPs who broke with their Progressive colleagues to support Woodsworth became the "Ginger Group". It was made up of United Farmers of Alberta MPs George Gibson Coote, Robert Gardiner, Edward Joseph Garland, Donald MacBeth Kennedy and Henry Elvins Spencer as well as United Farmers of Ontario MP Agnes Macphail. The group was later joined by Labour MPs J. S. Woodsworth, William Irvine, Abraham Albert Heaps and Angus MacInnis, independent MP Joseph Tweed Shaw and Progressive MPs Milton Neil Campbell, William John Ward, William Charles Good, and Preston Elliott.

Members of the Ginger Group played a role in forming the Cooperative Commonwealth Federation in 1932, with Woodsworth becoming the new party's leader.

The only sitting United Farmers of Alberta who did not join the CCF at its founding was William Thomas Lucas who ran for re-election unsuccessfully as a Conservative in 1935.

The name Ginger Group was also used to refer to a group of Conservative MPs who, in 1917 opposed Prime Minister Robert Borden's use of the Military Service Act to introduce conscription during the Conscription Crisis of 1917.

See also

List of political parties in Canada

References

1924 establishments in Canada
Agrarian parties in Canada
Nationalist parties in Canada
Co-operative Commonwealth Federation
Federal political parties in Canada
Labour history of Canada
Left-wing nationalist parties
Political party factions in Canada
Political schisms
Progressivism in Canada
Social democratic parties in Canada
Socialist parties in Canada
United Farmers